Wrestling at the 2007 Southeast Asian Games was held at the gymnasium in Rajamangala University of Technology Isan, Nakhon Ratchasima, Thailand

Medal tally

Medalists

Men's freestyle

Women's freestyle

External links
Southeast Asian Games Official Results

2007 Southeast Asian Games events
2007
Southeast Asian Games